This list of flora of the Mojave Desert region includes the flora of the Mojave Desert and of the mountains that are encircled by the Mojave Desert. Some of this flora is well above the level of growth of Yucca brevifolia (Joshua Trees), the upper reaches of which defines the outline of the Mojave Desert. Also included are flora of the Little San Bernardino Mountains dividing the Mojave Desert from the Colorado Desert.
 
The flora are arranged in several sublists with different organizations for the convenience of encyclopedia users with different purposes - alphabetically by scientific name, alphabetically by plant family then by scientific name, by growth pattern (e.g., tree, shrub, perennial, annual, etc.) then alphabetically by scientific name, by flower color (with duplicate entries when flower colors vary for a single species, and alphabetically by common name.

Each entry in the alphabetical list by scientific name is followed by the common name(s) (in bold and in parentheses), plant family, growth form(s), flower color(s), and brief etymology of the components of the scientific name.

List by scientific name

A
Abronia nana S. Watson var. covillei; (Coville's dwarf abronia); Nyctaginaceae; perennial herb; white, lavender, pink flowers; June–August bloom; "Abronia" from Greek "abros" = "graceful or delicate" re bracts below flowers, "nana" = "small" from the Greek "nannos" = "dwarf"
Abronia pogonantha (Mojave sand-verbena), Nyctaginaceae; "Abronia" from Greek "abros" = "graceful or delicate" (re bracts below flowers), Greek "pogon" = "beard" & "anthus" = "flowered" -> "pogonantha" = "bearded flowers" 
Abronia villosa var. villosa (desert sand-verbena), Nyctaginaceae four o'clock family; "Abronia" from Greek "abros" = "graceful or delicate" (re bracts below flowers), "villosa" = "hairy"
Acacia greggii (renamed to Senegalia greggii)
Acamptopappus shockleyi (Shockley's goldenhead); Asteraceae; Greek "a-kamptos" = "not-bent" & "pappos" = "pappus" (bristly sepals in Asteraceae flowers) -> "acamptopappus" = "unbent pappus", "shockleyi" = William Hillman Shockley - first to collect plants in the White Mountains
Acamptopappus sphaerocephalus (rayless goldenhead); Asteraceae; Greek "a-kamptos" = "not-bent" & "pappos" = "pappus" (bristly sepals in Asteraceae flowers) -> "acamptopappus" = "unbent pappus", Greek "sphaero" = "sphere", "cephalis" = "Head" -> or "round-headed" (flower heads) 
Achyronychia cooperi (frost mat onyx flower), Caryophyllaceae
Acmispon americanus, Fabaceae; Greek "acme" = "point or edge" for hook-tipped fruit, "americanus" = "of America"
Acmispon argophyllus, Fabaceae; Greek "acme" = "point or edge" for hook-tipped fruit of genus type, "argos" "shining, bright, silver" -> "argophyllus" = "silver leaved"
Acmispon brachycarpus, Fabaceae; Greek "acme" = "point or edge" for hook-tipped fruit of genus type, "brachy" = "short", "karpos" = "fruit" -> "brachycarpus" = "short-bodied (fruit)"
Acmispon glaber, Fabaceae; Greek "acme" = "point or edge" for hook-tipped fruit of genus type, -> "glaber" = "without hairs", glabrous
Acmispon heermannii), (Heermann's lotus) Fabaceae; Greek "acme" = "point or edge" for hook-tipped fruit of genus type, 
Acmispon rigidus (desert rock-pea, Fabaceae; Greek "acme" = "point or edge" for hook-tipped fruit of genus type,
Acmispon strigosus (stiff-haired lotus), Fabaceae; Greek "acme" = "point or edge" for hook-tipped fruit of genus type,
Adenophyllum cooperi (Cooper's dyssodia, Cooper's glandweed), Asteraceae
Aliciella latifolia (broad-leaved gilia), Polemoniaceae
Allenrolfea occidentalis (iodine bush), Chenopodiaceae
Allionia incarnata (windmills), Nyctaginaceae
Alnus rhombifolia (white alder), Betulaceae
Amaranthus fimbriatus (fringed amaranth), Amaranthaceae
Ambrosia acanthicarpa (western sand-bur, annual bur-sage), Asteraceae
Ambrosia dumosa (white bur-sage, burrobush), Asteraceae
Ambrosia salsola (cheesebush, winged ragweed), Asteraceae
Amsinckia tessellata (devil's lettuce, checker fiddleneck), Boraginaceae
Amsonia tomentosa, Apocynaceae
Anemopsis californica (yerba mansa), Saururaceae
Anisocoma acaulis (scalebud), Asteraceae
Antirrhinum filipes (twining snapdragon), Plantaginaceae, "fili" = "threadlike", "pes" = "foot" -> "threadlike stalks
Arabis dispar (See Boechera dispar)
Arabis pulchra var. gracilis (See Boechera pulchra)
Argemone corymbosa (prickly poppy), Papaveraceae
Arctostaphylos glauca (Ericaceae), big berry manzanita
Argemone munita (chicalote), Papaveraceae
Arida arizonica (Silver Lakes daisy), Asteraceae
Artemisia douglasiana (Douglas' mugwort), Asteraceae
Artemisia dracunculus (tarragon, wormwood), Asteraceae
Artemisia ludoviciana (western mugwort), Asteraceae
Artemisia tridentata (big sagebrush, Great Basin sagebrush), Asteraceae
Asclepias albicans, (wax milkweed), Apocynaceae
Asclepias erosa (desert milkweed), Apocynaceae
Asclepias fascicularis (narrow-leaf milkweed, Mexican whorled milkweed), Apocynaceae
Aster subulatus (name changed to Symphyotrichum subulatum)
Astragalus coccineus (scarlet milkvetch, scarlet locoweed), Fabaceae, perennial herb, red, "astragalos" = "ankle bone" for the shape of the seed, "coccineus" = "scarlet"
Astragalus douglasii (Douglas' milkvetch), Fabaceae
Astragalus jaegerianus (Lane Mountain milkvetch), Fabaceae
Astragalus layneae (Layne milkvetch), Fabaceae
Astragalus lentiginosus (Freckled milkvetch), Fabaceae
Astragalus newberryi var. newberryi (Newberry milkvetch), Fabaceae
Atrichoseris platyphylla (gravel ghost, parachute plant), Asteraceae
Atriplex canescens (four-winged saltbrush), Chenopodiaceae, "canescens" = "covered with short white hairs"
Atriplex confertifolia (shadscale), Chenopodiaceae
Atriplex covillei (arrow-scale, Coville's orach), Chenopodiaceae
Atriplex elegans (wheel-scale, Mecca orach), Chenopodiaceae
Atriplex hymenelytra (desert holly), Chenopodiaceae
Atriplex polycarpa (all-scale, cattle spinach), Chenopodiaceae
Atriplex serenana (bractscale), Chenopodiaceae
Atriplex spinifera (spiny saltbrush), Chenopodiaceae

B
Baccharis salicifolia (mule fat), Asteraceae
Baccharis salicina (Emory baccharis), Asteraceae
Baccharis sergiloides (Squaw waterweed, desert baccharis), Asteraceae
Baileya multiradiata (desert marigold), Asteraceae)
Baileya pauciradiata (lax-flower, Colorado desert marigold), Asteraceae
Baileya pleniradiata (wooly marigold), Asteraceae
Bebbia juncea var. aspera (sweetbush), Asteraceae
Boechera dispar (Brassicaceae
Boechera pulchra (beautiful rock-cress, Prince's rock cress), Brassicaceae
Boerhavia triquetra (spiderling), Nyctaginaceae
Bouteloua aristidoides (needle gramma), Poaceae
Bouteloua barbata (six-week gramma), Poaceae
Brandegea bigelovii (brandegea), Cucurbitaceae
Brassica tournefortii (Sahara mustard), Brassicaceae
Brickellia californica (brickellia), Asteraceae
Brickellia desertorum (desert brickelbush), Asteraceae
Brickellia incana (wooly brickellia), Asteraceae
Brickellia longifolia (long-leaved brickellia), Asteraceae
Brickellia oblongifolia var. linifolia (pinyon brickellia), Asteraceae
Bromus madritensis (red brome, foxtail chess), Poaceae
Buddleja utahensis (Panamint butterfly bush), Scrophulariaceae

C
Calochortus kennedyi var. kennedyi (Mariposa lily), Liliaceae
Calochortus striatus (alkali Mariposa lily), Liliaceae
Calycoseris parryi (yellow tack-stem), Asteraceae
Calycoseris wrightii (white tack-stem), Asteraceae
Calyptridium monandrum (sand-cress), Montiaceae
Camissonia campestris (Mojave sun cup, field primrose), Onagraceae
Camissoniopsis pallida subsp. hallii (pale primrose), Hall's suncup Onagraceae
Camissoniopsis pallida ssp. pallida (pale suncup), Onagraceae
Canbya candida (pygmy poppy), Papaveraceae
Castela emoryi (crucifixion thorn), Simaroubaceae
Castilleja chromosa (desert paintbrush), Orobanchaceae
Castilleja exserta ssp. venusta (purple owl's clover), Orobanchaceae
Castilleja plagiotoma (Mojave paintbrush), Orobanchaceae
Caulanthus inflatus (desert candle), Brassicaceae
Centrostegia thurberi (red triangles), Polygonaceae
Chaenactis fremontii (Fremont pincushion, desert pincushion), Asteraceae
Chaenactis macrantha (Mojave pincushion), Asteraceae
Chaenactis stevioides (Steve's pincushion), Asteraceae
Chamomilla suaveolens (common pineapple weed), Asteraceae
Chamaesyce albomarginata (renamed to Euphorbia albomarginata)
Chamaesyce setiloba (renamed to Euphorbia setiloba)
Chrysothamnus nauseosus (See Ericameria nauseosa var. mohavensis
Chrysothamnus paniculatus (See Ericameria paniculata 
Cheilanthes covillei (Coville's lip fern), Pteridaceae, Greek "cheilos" ="lip", "anthos" = "flower" for lip-like membrane (indusium) covering spore-bearing parts, "coillei" for botanist Frederick Vernon Coville
Chenopodium californicum (pigweed), Chenopodiaceae
Chilopsis linearis (desert willow), Bignoniaceae
Chorizanthe brevicornu var. brevicornu (brittle spineflower), Polygonaceae, "chorizo" = "divided", "anthos" = "flower" (divided calyx in the flower), "brevi" = "short", "cornu" = "horn"
Chorizanthe rigida (spiny-herb), Polygonaceae, "chorizo" = "divided", "anthos" = "flower" (divided calyx in the flower), rigida = stiff or rigid leaves
Chylismia brevipes (golden evening primrose), Onagraceae
Chylismia claviformis (brown-eyed primrose), Onagraceae
Cirsium mohavense (Mojave thistle), Asteraceae
Cirsium neomexicanum (desert thistle, Asteraceae
Cirsium occidentale (western thistle), Asteraceae
Cleomella obtusifolia (Mojave stinkweed), Cleomaceae
Coleogyne ramosissima (blackbrush), Rosaceae
Collinsia bartsiifolia var. davidsonii (Chinese houses), Plantaginaceae
Cordylanthus eremicus (desert bird's-beak), Asteraceae
Coreopsis bigelovii (See Leptosyne bigelovii
Coryphantha chlorantha (fringe-flowered cactus), Cactaceae, Greek "koryphe" = "apex", "anthos" = "flower"
Coryphantha alversonii (foxtail cactus), Cactaceae 
Coryphantha vivipara (viviparous foxtail cactus), Cactaceae
Croton californicus (California croton), Euphorbiaceae
Cryptantha circumscissa (forget-me-not), Boraginaceae
Cryptantha angustifolia (forget-me-not), Boraginaceae
Cryptantha intermedia (forget-me-not), Boraginaceae
Cryptantha maritima (forget-me-not), Boraginaceae
Cryptantha micrantha (forget-me-not), Boraginaceae
Cryptantha nevadensis (forget-me-not), Boraginaceae
Cryptantha pterocarva (forget-me-not), Boraginaceae
Cryptantha spp. (forget-me-not), Boraginaceae
Cucurbita palmata (coyote melon), Cucurbitaceae
Cuscuta denticulata (small-toothed dodder), Convolvulaceae
Cylindropuntia acanthocarpa var. coloradensis (buckhorn cholla, staghorn cholla), Cactaceae
Cylindropuntia echinocarpa (silver cholla), Cactaceae
Cylindropuntia ramosissima (pencil cholla), Cactaceae
Cymopterus deserticola (desert cymopterus), Apiaceae
Cymopterus terebinthinus, (turpentine cymopterus), Apiaceae
Cynanchum utahense (synonym of Funastrum utahense)

D
Dalea mollissima (silk dalea), Fabaceae
Dasyochloa pulchella (desert fluff-grass), Poaceae
Datura wrightii (jimson weed, thorn-apple, sacred datura), Solanaceae
Dedeckera eurekensis (July gold), Polygonaceae
Deinandra arida (Red Rock tarplant), Asteraceae
Delphinium parishii (desert larkspur), Ranunculaceae
Dipterostemon capitatus ssp. pauciflorus (desert hyacinth), Themidaceae
Dicoria canescens (bugseed), Asteraceae, "canescens" = "covered with short white hairs"
Dieteria canescens (hoary aster), Asteraceae, "canescens" = "covered with short white hairs"
Distichlis spicata (saltgrass), Poaceae
Dithyrea californica (spectacle-pod), Brassicaceae
Dudleya saxosa ssp. aliodes (desert live-forever), Crassulaceae
Dudleya saxosa ssp. saxosa (Panamint dudleya), Crassulaceae

E
Echinocactus polycephalus (cotton-top), Cactaceae
Echinocereus engelmannii (hedge-hog cactus, calico cactus), Cactaceae
Echinocereus mojavensis (Mojave mound cactus), Cactaceae
Encelia actoni (Acton encelia), Asteraceae
Encelia farinosa (brittlebush, incienso), Asteraceae
Encelia frutescens (rayless encelia, green brittlebush), Asteraceae
Encelia virginensis (Virgin River brittlebrush), Asteraceae
Enceliopsis covillei (Panamint daisy), Asteraceae
Enceliopsis nudicaulis var. nudicaulis (Naked-stemmed daisy), Asteraceae
Ephedra californica (California ephedra), Ephedraceae 
Ephedra nevadensis (Nevada ephedra, Mormon tea, Nevada joint-fir), Ephedraceae
Ephedra funerea (Death Valley ephedra), Ephedraceae
Ephedra trifurca (long-leaved ephedra), Ephedraceae
Ephedra viridis (green ephedra, mountain ephedra), Ephedraceae
Equisetum laevigatum (Braun's hoursetail), Equisetaceae
Eremalche exilis (white mallow), Malvaceae
Eremalche rotundifolia (desert five-spot), Malvaceae
Eremothera boothii subsp. condensata, Onagraceae
Eremothera boothii subsp. desertorum (Booth's primrose), Onagraceae
Eremothera refracta (narrow-leaved primrose, narrow-leaved suncup), Onagraceae, "eremia" = "desert", "refracta" = "broken"
Eriastrum densifolium (perennial eriastrum), Polemoniaceae
Ericameria cooperi (Cooper's goldenbush), Asteraceae
Ericameria cuneata var. spathulata (cliff goldenbush), Asteraceae
Ericameria laricifolia (turpentine bush), Asteraceae
Ericameria linearifolia (interior goldenbush, linear-leaved goldenbush, stenotopsis), Asteraceae
Ericameria nauseosa var. mohavensis (rubber rabbitbrush), Asteraceae
Ericameria paniculata (black-banded rabbitbrush), Asteraceae
Erigeron concinnus (hairy daisy), Asteraceae
Erigeron foliosus (fleabane daisy), Asteraceae
Eriodictyon angustifolium (narrowleaf yerba santa), Boraginaceae
Eriodictyon trichocalyx var. trichocalyx (yerba santa), Boraginaceae
Eriogonum deflexum (flat-topped buckwheat, skeleton weed), Polygonaceae
Eriogonum fasciculatum var. polifolium (Mojave Desert California buckwheat), Polygonaceae
Eriogonum inflatum (desert trumpet), Polygonaceae
Eriogonum plumatella (Yucca buckwheat, flat-topped buckwheat), Polygonaceae
Eriogonum palmerianum (Palmer buckwheat), Polygonaceae
Eriophyllum mohavense (Barstow wooly sunflower, woolly sunflower), Asteraceae
Eriophyllum pringlei (Pringle's wooly daisy), Asteraceae
Eriophyllum wallacei (Wallace's wooly daisy), Asteraceae
Erodium cicutarium (red-stemmed filaree, cranesbill), Geraniaceae
Erodium texanum (desert heron's bill), Geraniaceae
Eschscholzia androuxii (Joshua Tree poppy), Papaveraceae
Eschscholzia californica (California poppy), Papaveraceae
Eschscholzia glyptosperma (desert gold-poppy), Papaveraceae
Eschscholzia minutiflora (pygmy poppy), Papaveraceae
Eschscholzia papastillii (cryptic desert poppy), Papaveraceae
Eucnide urens (rock nettle, sting-bush), Loasaceae
Euphorbia albomarginata  (rattlesnake weed, white-margin sandmat), Euphorbiaceae
Euphorbia schizoloba (Mojave spurge), Euphorbiaceae
Euphorbia setiloba (Yuma spurge, bristle-lobed sandmat), Euphorbiaceae
Euthamia occidentalis (western flat-topped goldenrod), Asteraceae

F
Fagonia laevis (California fagonbush), Zygophyllaceae
Fallugia paradoxa (Apache plume), Rosaceae
Ferocactus cylindraceus (California barrel cactus, visnaga, bisnaga), Cactaceae
Festuca octoflora (six-weeks fescue), Poaceae
Funastrum cynanchoides (climbing milkweed), Apocynaceae
Funastrum hirtellum (rambling milkweed), Apocynaceae

G
Geraea canescens (desert sunflower), Asteraceae, "canescens" = "covered with short white hairs"
Gilia latiflora (broad-flowered gilia), Polemoniaceae
Gilmania luteola (golden carpet), Polygonaceae
Glycyrrhiza lepidota (wild licorice), Fabaceae
Glyptopleura setulosa (carveseed, keysia), Asteraceae
Gnaphalium palustre (western marsh cudweed), Asteraceae
Grusonia parishii (club cholla, mat cholla, horse crippler, dead cactus), Cactaceae, yellow flowers
Grayia spinosa (hop-sage), Chenopodiaceae
Gutierrezia microcephala (sticky snakeweed, matchweed), Asteraceae

H
Hecastocleis shockleyi (hecastocleis), Asteraceae
Heliotropium curassavicum (heliotrope), Boraginaceae
Hesperocallis undulata) (desert lily), Agavaceae, "hesperos" = "western", "undulate" = "wavy margined (leaves)"
Hesperoyucca whipplei) (our lord's candle), Agavaceae
Hibiscus denudatus (pale face, rock hibiscus), Malvaceae
Hilaria rigida (big galleta), Poaceae
Holmgrenanthe petrophila (rock lady), Plantaginaceae
Hulsea vestita ssp. parryi (Parry's sunflower), Asteraceae
Hyptis emoryi (desert lavender), Fabaceae
Hymenoclea salsola (See Ambrosia salsola)

I
Isocoma acradenia (alkali goldenbush), Asteraceae

J
Juniperus californica (California juniper), Cupressaceae
Juniperus osteosperma (Utah juniper), Cupressaceae

K
Keckiella antirrhinoides var. microphylla (snapdragon penstemon, yellow keckiella), Plantaginaceae
Keckiella rothrockii (Rothrock's keckiella), Plantaginaceae
Krameria erecta (pima rhatany), Krameriaceae
Krameria bicolor (white rhatany), Krameriaceae
Krascheninnikovia lanata (winter fat), Chenopodiaceae

L
Lactuca serriola (prickly lettuce), Asteraceae
Langloisia setosissima subsp. punctata (lilac sunbonnet), Polemoniaceae, "setosissima" = "very hairy bristly"
Langloisia setosissima subsp. setosissima (bristly langloisia), Polemoniaceae
Larrea tridentata (creosote bush), Zygophyllaceae
Lasthenia gracilis (goldfields), Asteraceae
Layia glandulosa (white tidy-tips), Asteraceae
Lepidium flavum var. flavum (yellow pepper-grass), Brassicaceae
Lepidium fremontii (desert alyssum, bush peppergrass), Brassicaceae
Lepidium lasiocarpum (desert peppergrass), Brassicaceae
Lepidospartum latisquamum (greenbroom), Asteraceae
Lepidospartum squamatum (scale-broom), Asteraceae
Leptosiphon breviculus (Mojave linanthus), Polemoniaceae
Leptosyne bigelovii (Bigelow's tickseed, Bigelow's coreopsis), Asteraceae
Linanthus dichotomus (evening snow), Polemoniaceae
Linanthus maculatus (pygmy pink-spot, spotted gilia, Little San Bernardino Mountains linanthus), Polemoniaceae
Linanthus parryae (Parry's linanthus, sandblossoms), Polemoniaceae
Linum lewisii (flax), Linaceae
Loeseliastrum matthewsii (desert calico), Polemoniaceae
Loeseliastrum schottii (Schott gilia, little sunbonnets), Polemoniaceae
Logfia filaginoides (herba impia, cottonrose), Asteraceae
Lomatium mohavense (desert parsley), Apiaceae
Lotus argophyllus (name changed to Acmispon argophyllus
Lotus heermannii (name changed to Acmispon heermannii
Lotus humistratus (name changed to Acmispon brachycarpus
Lotus purshianus (name changed to Acmispon americanus
Lotus rigidus (name changed to
Lotus scoparius (name changed to Acmispon glaber)
Lotus strigosus (name changed to Acmispon strigosus<rp|728})
Lupinus arizonicus (Arizona lupine), Fabaceae
Lupinus concinnus (bajada lupine, elegant lupine), Fabaceae, "concinnus" = "neatly made" or "elegant"
Lupinus excubitus (grape soda lupine), Fabaceae
Lupinus odoratus (royal desert lupine), Fabaceae
Lupinus shockleyi (desert lupine, Shockley lupine), Fabaceae
Lycium cooperi (Cooper's box thorn, peach thorn), Solanaceae
Lycium pallidum (rabbit thorn), Solanaceae

M
Malacothrix coulteri (snake's head), Asteraceae
Malacothrix glabrata (desert dandelion), Asteraceae
Marah fabaceus (wild cucumber), Cucurbitaceae
marah macrocarpus (manroot), Cucurbitaceae
Mammillaria tetrancistra (nipple cactus), Cactaceae
Marina parryi (Parry dalea, Parry's false prairie-clover), Fabaceae
Menodora scabra var. glabrescens (rough menodora, broom twinberry), Oleaceae
Menodora spinescens var. spinescens (spiny menodora), Oleaceae
Mentzelia albicaulis (white-stemmed stick-leaf), Loasaceae
Mentzelia involucrata (sand blazing star), Loasaceae
Mentzelia laevicaulis (blazing star), Loasaceae
Mimulus bigelovii (Bigelow's monkeyflower), Phrymaceae
Mimulus mohavensis (Mojave monkeyflower), Phrymaceae
Mimulus rupicola (Death Valley monkeyflower, rock midget), Phrymaceae
Mirabilis laevis (wishbone bush), Nyctaginaceae
Mirabilis multiflora (giant four o'clock), Nyctaginaceae
Mohavea breviflora (lesser mohavea), Plantaginaceae
Mohavea confertiflora (ghost-flower), Plantaginaceae
Mollugo cerviana (carpet-weed), Molluginaceae
Monardella exilis (Mojave pennyroyal), Lamiaceae
Monoptilon bellidiforme (small desert star), Asteraceae
Monoptilon bellioides (desert star), Asteraceae
Muhlenbergia porteri (Porter's muhly), Poaceae

N
Nama demissum (purple mat), Boraginaceae
Nicolletia occidentalis (hole-in-the sand plant), Asteraceae
Nicotiana obtusifolia (coyote tobacco), Solanaceae
Nicotiana quadrivalvis (Indian tobacco), Solanaceae
Nitrophila mohavensis (Amargosa nitrophila), Amaranthaceae
Nolina bigelovii (Bigelow's nolina), Ruscaceae
Nolina parryi (Parry's nolina, Parry's beargrass), Ruscaceae

O
Oenothera californica (evening primrose), Onagraceae
Oenothera primiveris subsp. bufonis (yellow evening primrose, spring evening primrose), Onagraceae
Oligomeris linifolia (linear-leaved cambess), Resedaceae
Opuntia basilaris (beavertail cactus), Cactaceae
Opuntia chlorotica (pancake-pear), Cactaceae
Opuntia polyacantha var. erinacea (Mojave prickly-pear, old man cactus), Cactaceae
Orobanche cooperi (Cooper's broomrape), Orobanchaceae
Oxytheca perfoliata (punctured bract), Polygonaceae

P
Palafoxia arida (desert needles), Asteraceae
Pectis papposa (cinch-weed), Asteraceae
Pectocarya penicillata (hairy-leaved comb-bur, northern pectocarya), Boraginaceae
Pectocarya setosa (stiff-stemmed comb-bur, round-nut pectocarya, popcorn flower), Boraginaceae
Pediomelum castoreum (beaver dam breadroot), Fabaceae
Pellaea mucronata (bird's foot fern), Pteridaceae
Penstemon albomarginatus (white-margined beardtoungue), Plantaginaceae
Penstemon calcareus (limestone beardtongue), Plantaginaceae
Penstemon fruticiformis var. fruticiformis (Panamint penstemon), Plantaginaceae
Penstemon palmeri var. palmeri (Palmer's penstemon), Plantaginaceae
Penstemon pseudospectabilis (Mojave beardtongue), Plantaginaceae
Penstemon thompsoniae (Thompson's beardtongue), Plantaginaceae
Penstemon utahensis (Utah firecracker, Utah penstemon), Plantaginaceae
Peritoma arborea (bladderpod), Cleomaceae
Perityle emoryi (Emory rock daisy), Asteraceae
Petalonyx nitidus (canyon petalonyx, smooth sandpaper plant), Loasaceaelis
Petalonyx thurberi ssp. gilmanii (Death Valley sandpaper plant), Loasaceae
Petalonyx thurberi ssp. thurberi (sandpaper plant), Loasaceae
Peucephyllum schottii (pygmy cedar), Asteraceae
Phacelia campanularia (desert Canterbury bell), Boraginaceae
Phacelia crenulata (notch-leaved phacelia), Boraginaceae
Phacelia curvipes (Washoe phacelia), Boraginaceae
Phacelia distans (lace-leaf phacelia), Boraginaceae
Phacelia fremontii (Fremont's phacelia), Boraginaceae
Phacelia ivesiana (Ives phacelia), Boraginaceae
Phacelia neglecta (alkali phacelia), Boraginaceae
Phacelia pachyphylla (thick-leaved phacelia), Boraginaceae
Phacelia parishii (Parish's phacelia), Boraginaceae
Phacelia pedicellata (Specter phacelia), Boraginaceae
Phacelia rotundifolia (round-leaved phacelia), Boraginaceae
Phacelia vallis-mortae (Death Valley phacelia), Boraginaceae
Pholisma arenarium (scaly-stemmed sand plant), Boraginaceae
Phoradendron californicum (desert mistletoe), Viscaceae
Phoradendron villosum (oak mistletoe), Viscaceae
Phragmites australis (common reed), Poaceae
Physalis crassifolia (thick-leaved ground-cherry), Solanaceae
Physaria tenella (beadpod, bladderpod), Brassicaceae
Pinus edulis (Colorado pinyon), Pinaceae
Pinus flexilis (limber pine), Pinaceae
Pinus longaeva (bristlecone pine), Pinaceae
Pinus monophylla (singleleaf pinyon pine), Pinaceae
Pinus sabiniana (gray pine, ghost pine, foothill pine), Pinaceae
Plagiobothrys parishii (Parish's popcorn flower), Boraginaceae
Plantago ovata var. fastigiata (desert plantain)
Pluchea sericea (arrowweed), Asteraceae
Populus fremontii (Fremont cottonwood), Salicaceae
Porophyllum gracile (pore-leaf, odora, hierba del venado), Asteraceae
Portulaca halimoides (desert portulaca, silk-cotton purslane), Portulacaceae
Prosopis glandulosa ver. torreyana (honey mesquite), Fabaceae
Prosopis pubescens (screw bean, tornillo), Fabaceae
Prunus eremophila (Mojave Desert plum), Rosaceae
Prunus fasciculata (desert almond), Rosaceae
Psathyrotes annua (mealy rosette, annual turtleback), Asteraceae
Psathyrotes ramosissima (turtleback, velvet rosette), Asteraceae
Psilostrophe cooperi (paper daisy), Asteraceae
Psorothamnus arborescens (indigo bush), Fabaceae
Purshia tridentata (bitterbrush, antelope bush), Rosaceae

R
Rafinesquia neomexicana (desert chicory), Asteraceae
Rorippa nasturtium-aquaticum (yellow cress, water cress), Brassicaceae
Rhus aromatica (skunkbrush), Anacardiaceae
Robinia neomexicana (New Mexico locust), Fabaceae
Rumex hymenosepalus (canaigre, wild rhubarb), Polygonaceae

S
Salix exigua (sand-bar willow, narrow-leaved willow), Salicaceae, "salix" Latin for willow 
Salix laevigata (red willow), Salicaceae, "laevis" = "smooth or unhairy"
Salix lasiolepis (arroyo willow), Salicaceae, "lasio" = "wooly"
Salsola tragus (tumbleweed, Russian thistle), Chenopodiaceae, "salsola" = "salty"
Salvia carduacea (thistle sage), Lamiaceae
Salvia columbariae (chia), Lamiaceae
Salvia dorii (desert sage, gray ball sage), Lamiaceae
Salvia funerea (Death Valley sage), Lamiaceae
Salvia mohavensis (Mojave sage), Lamiaceae
Sarcobatus vermiculatus (greasewood), Chenopodiaceae; Greek "sarx" = "flesh", "batos" = "bramble" 
Sarcostemma cynanchoides (renamed to Funastrum cyanchoides)
Sclerocactus polyancistrus (pineapple cactus, devil claw), Cactaceae, Greek "skleros" = "hard" 
Scopulophila rixfordii (Rixford rockwort), Caryophyllaceae
Scutellaria mexicana (bladder sage, paper-bag bush), Lamiaceae
Senecio flaccidus var. monoesis (groundsel, California butterweed), Asteraceae
Senecio mohavensis (Mojave butterweed), Asteraceae
Senegalia greggii (catclaw, wait-a-minute bush), Fabaceae
Senna armata (desert senna, spiny senna), Fabaceae
Sesuvium verrucosum (western sea purslane), Aizoaceae, "verrucosum" = "warty" referring to mipple-like projections visible with a hand lens 
Sphaeralcea ambigua (apricot mallow, desert mallow)
Stanleya elata) (Panamint plume, tall prince's plume]]), Brassicaceae
Stanleya pinnata) (prince's plume), Brassicaceae
Stephanomeria exigua (annual mitral), Asteraceae
Stephanomeria parryi (Parry's stephanomeria, Parry rock-pink), Asteraceae
Stephanomeria pauciflora var. pauciflora (wire lettuce, perennial wire lettuce desert straw), Asteraceae
Stephanomeria virgata var. pleurocarpa (tall stephanomeria), Asteraceae
Stillingia linearifolia (linear-leaved stillingia), Euphorbiacae
Stillingia paucidentata (tooth-leaf), Euphorbiaceae
Stillingia spinulosa (annual stillingia), Euphorbiaceae
Stipa hymenoides (Indian ricegrass), Poaceae
Stipa speciosa (desert needle grass), Poaceae
Suaeda nigra (bush seepweed, ink-blite), Chenopodiaceae
Swallenia alexandrae (Eureka Valley dunes grass), Poaceae
Symphyotrichum subulatum (annual saltmarsh aster), Asteraceae
Syntrichopappus fremontii (false woolly daisy), Asteraceae
Sysymbrium spp. (London rocket), Brassicaceae

T
Tamarix aphylla (Athel tree), Tamaricaceae
Tamarix ramosissima (salt cedar, tamarisk), Tamaricaceae
Tauschia parishii (Parish's umbrellawort). Apiaceae
Tetradymia axillaris var. longispina (cotton-thorn), Asteraceae, "tetra" = "four", "dymos" = "together" (first described genus member had 4 flowers per head), "aris" = "of the" -> "axillaris" = "of the (leaf) axil"  
Tetrapteron palmeri (tetrapteron, Palmer primrose), Onagracae
Thamnosma montana (turpentine broom), Rutaceae
Thelypodium integrifolium ssp. affine (alkali crucifer), Brassicaceae
Thymophylla pentachaeta (thymophylla), Asteraceae
Thysanocarpus curvipes (fringe-pod), Brassicaceae
Tidestromia lanuginosa (wooly tidestromia), Amaranthaceae
Tidestromia suffruticosa (honey-sweet), Amaranthaceae
Tiquilia canescens (woody crinklemat), Boraginaceae, "canescens" = "covered with short white hairs"
Tiquilia nuttallii (Nuttall's crinklemat, Nuttall Sandmat, Nuttall's Coldenia), Boraginaceae
Tiquilia plicata, (tiquilia), Boraginaceae
Toxicoscordion brevibracteatum (death camas, desert zygadene), Melanthiaceae
Tragia ramosa (noseburn), Euphorbiaceae, "ramosa" = "branched"
Tribulus terrestris (puncture vine, goathead), Zygophyllaceae
Trichoptilium incisum (yellow-heads), Asteraceae
Tripterocalyx micranthus (small-flowered abronia), Nyctaginaceae
Trixis californica var. californica (trixis), Asteraceae

U
Uropapus lindleyi (silverpuffs), Asteraceae

V
Verbena gooddingii (Gooding's verbena, southwestern verbena), Verbenaceae
Viguiera parishii (Parish's goldeneye), Asteraceae

X
Xanthisma gracile (annual bristleweed), Asteraceae
Xylorhiza tortifolia var. tortifolia (Mojave aster), Asteraceae

Y
Yucca baccata var. baccata (banana yucca, fleshy-fruited yucca, Spanish bayonet), Agavaceae
Yucca brevifolia) (Joshua tree), Agavaceae)
Yucca schidigera (Mojave yucca), Agavaceae

List by plant family and genus

A
Agavaceae (century plant family), Greek  "agauos" = "admirable (appearance)"
Agave, (century plant)), Greek  "agauos" = "admirable (appearance)"
Agave deserti var. simplex (simple desert agave),  "simplex" = "simple, undivided, or unbranched"
Agave utahensis var. eborispina, (ivory spined agave), "utahensis" = "Utah", Latin "eboris" = "ivory" and "spina" = "thorn" -> (white marginal spines and terminal spine turning white with age)
Agave utahensis var. nevadensis (Clark Mountain agave), "utahensis" = "Utah", "nevadensis" = "Nevada"

Hesperocallis (Desert lily) (desert lily)), Greek "hesperos" = "of the evening, western", "kallos" = "beautiful"
Hesperocallis undulata), "undulate" = "wavy (margins)"

Hesperoyucca (chaparral yucca, Quixote plant, our lord's candle),  Greek "hesperos" = "of the evening, western", misnamed "yucca" from the Caribbean name for the unrelated manihot or cassava 
Hesperoyucca whipplei), "whipplei" in honor of Pacific Railroad Survey surveyor Amiel Weeks Whipple

Yucca (Spanish bayonet, yucca), misnamed "yucca" from the Caribbean name for the unrelated manihot or cassava 
Yucca baccata (banana yucca), blue yucca), Latin "bacca" = "small round fruit" 
Yucca brevifolia ((Joshua tree), "brevi" = "short", "folia" = "Leaf"
Yucca schidigera (Mojave yucca), Latin "schidigera" = "having wood splinters" (leaf blade margins peeling off splinters)

Aizoaceae (fig-marigold family, ice plant family)
Sesuvium (sea-purslane)
Sesuvium verrucosum (western sea-purslane)
Trianthema (horse-purslane)
Trianhema portulacastrum

Amaranthaceae, amaranth family
Amaranthus (amaranth, pigweed} 
Amaranthus blitoides (procumbent pigweed
Amaranthus fimbriatus (fringed amaranth)
Amaranthus palmeri
Amaranthus torreyi

Nitrophila
Nitrophila mohavensis (Amargosa nitrophila)
Nitrophila occidentalis

Tidestromia
Tidestromia lanuginosa (wooly tidestromia)
Tidestromia suffruticosa var. oblongifolia

Anacardiaceae (sumac family, cashew family)
Rhus
Rhus aromatica (skunk bush)

Toxicodendron (poison oak, poison ivy)
Toxicodendron diversilobum (western poison oak)

Apiaceae, carrot family
Bowlesia
Bowlesia incana

Cymopterus
Cymopterus aboriginum
Cymopterus deserticola (desert cympopterus)
Cymopterus gilmanii (Gilman's cymopterus)
Cymopterus panamintensis var. acutifolius
Cymopterus panamintensis var. panamintensis
Cymopterus ripleyi (Ripley's cymopterus)

Daucus)
Daucus pusillus)
 
Lomatium)
Lomatium foeniculaceum subsp. fimbriatum
Lomatium mohavense
Lomatium nevadense var. nevadense
Lomatium nevadense var. parishii
Lomatium parryi
Lomatium utriculatum

Oenanthe
Oenanthe sarmentosa

Vesper
Vesper multinervatus, syn. Cymopterus multinervatus (purple-nerve cymopterus)

Yabea
Yabea microcarpa

Apocynaceae, dogbane family

Amsonia
Amsonia tomentosa

Asclepias (milkweed)
Asclepias albicans (white-stemmed milkweed)
Asclepias eriocarpa (Kotolo) 
Asclepias erosa (Desert milkweed)
Asclepias fascicularis (narrow-leaf milkweed)
Asclepias nyctaginifolia (Mojave milkweed)
Asclepias subulata (rush milkweed)

Funastrum
Funastrum cynanchoides)
Funastrum hirtellum (trailing townula)
Funastrum utahense (Utah vine))

Matelea
Matelea parvifolia (spearleaf)
Araliaceae (ginseng family))
Hydrocotyle (marsh pennywort
Hydrocotyle ranunculoides
Hydrocotyle umbellata
Hydrocotyle verticillata
Asteraceae (Compositae), (sunflower family)
 
Acamptopappus (goldenhead)
Acamptopappus shockleyi (Shockley's goldenhead))
Acamptopappus sphaerocephalus var. hirtellus)
Acamptopappus sphaerocephalus var. sphaerocephalus)

Achillea (yarrow)
Achillea millefolium

Adenophyllum)
Adenophyllum cooperi
Adenophyllum porophylloides

Ageratina (snakeroot)
Ageratina herbacea

Almutaster (marsh alkali aster)
Almutaster pauciflorus

Amauriopsis (yellow ragleaf))
Amauriopsis dissecta

Ambrosia (ragweed, bur-sage, burrobrush)
Ambrosia acanthicarpa (annual bur-sage)
Ambrosia confertiflora
Ambrosia dumosa (white bur-sage)
Ambrosia eriocentra (wooly bur-sage)
Ambrosia salsola var. pentalepis
Ambrosia salsola var. salsola

Amphipappus (chaff-bush)
Amphipappus fremontii var. fremontii)
Amphipappus fremontii var. spinosus)

Ancistrocarphus (groundstar, wooly fishhooks)
Ancistrocarphus filagineus

Anisocoma (scalebud)
Anisocoma acaulis

Arida
Arida arizonica (Silver Lake daisy)
Arida carnosa

Artemisia (mugwort, sagebrush, sagewort)
Artemisia biennis (biennial wormwood), (non-native)
Artemisia bigelovii (Bigelow sagebrush)
Artemisia dracunculus (tarragon)
Artemisia ludoviciana (silver wormword)
Artemisia ludoviciana subsp. albula
Artemisia ludoviciana subsp. incompta
Artemisia nova (black sagebrush) 
Artemisia spinescens (budsage)
Artemisia tridentata subsp. parishii
Artemisia tridentata subsp. tridentata (big sagebrush)

Atrichoseris (gravel-ghost)
Atrichoseris platyphylla

Baccharis
Baccharis brachyphylla
Baccharis salicifolia
Baccharis salicina
Baccharis sarothroides
Baccharis sergiloides

Bahia
Bahia neomexicana

Bahiopsis
Bahiopsis parishii
Bahiopsis reticulata

Baileya (desert marigold)
Baileya multiradiata
Baileya pauciradiata
Baileya reticulate

Bebbia (sweetbush)
Bebbia juncea

Bidens
Bidens frondosa (sticktight)
Bidens laevis (bur-marigold

Brickellia (brickellbush)
Brickellia atractyloides var. arguta (pungent brickelbush) 
Brickellia atractyloides var. atractyloides (spearleaf brickelbush)
Brickellia atractyloides var. odontolepis
Brickellia desertorum
Brickellia incana
Brickellia longifolia var. longifolia
Brickellia longifolia var. multiflora
Brickellia microphylla var. scabra
Brickellia nevinii
Brickellia oblongifolia var. linifolia

Calycoseris (tack-stem
Calycoseris parryi
Calycoseris wrightii

Cardus
Cardus acanthoides (blessed thistle) (non-native)
Centauria melitensis (tocolate) (non-native)
Centauria solstitialis (yellow star-thistle) (non-native)

Carthamus (distaff thistle)
Carthamus creticus (smooth distaff thistle) (non-native)

Centauria (knapweed, star-thistle) 
Centauria benedicta
Chaenactis fremontii
Cirsium mohavense
Deinandra arida
Dicoria canescens
Dieteria canescens
Encelia actoni
Encelia farinosa
Encelia frutescens
Enceliopsis nudicaulis
Ericameria cooperi
Ericameria cuneata
Ericameria linearifolia
Ericameria nauseosa
Ericameria paniculata
Erigeron concinnus
Eriophyllum mohavense
Eriophyllum pringlei
Eriophyllum wallacei
Geraea canescens
Glyptopleura setulosa
Gutierrezia microcephala
Hecastocleis shockleyi
Isocoma acradenia
Lasthenia gracilis
Layia glandulosa
Lepidospartum latisquamum
Lepidospartum squamatum
Leptosyne bigelovii
Logfia filaginoides
Malacothrix coulteri
Malacothrix glabrata
Monoptilon bellidiforme
Monoptilon bellioides
Nicolletia occidentalis
Palafoxia arida
Pectis papposa
Perityle emoryi
Peucephyllum schottii
Porophyllum gracile
Psthyrotes annua
Psathyrotes ramosissima
Psilostrophe cooperi
Rafinesquia neomexicana
Senecio flaccidus
Senecio mohavensis
Stephanomeria parryi
Stephanomeria pauciflora
Syntrocopappus fremontii
Tetradymia axillaria
Tetradymia canescens
Tetradymia spinosa
Tetradymia stenolepis
Thymophylla pentachaeta
Trichoptilium incisum
Trixis californica var. californica
Xanthisma gracile
Xylorhiza tortifolia

B
Bignoniaceae (bignonia family)
Chilopsis linearis

Boraginaceae (borage family)
Amsinckia tessellata
Cryptantha spp.
Eriodictyon trichocalyx
Heliotropium curassavicum
Nama demissum
Pectocarya penicillata
Pectocarya setosa
Phacelia campanularia
Phacelia crenulata
Phacelia curvipes
Phacelia distans
Phacelia fremontii
Phacelia pachyphylla
Phacelia parishii
Phacelia pedicellata
Phacelia rotundifolia
Phacelia vallis-mortae
Pholisma arenarium
Plagiobothrys parishii
Tiquilia plicata

Brassicaceae (mustard family)
Boechera pulchra
Brassica tournefortii
Caulanthus inflatus
Dithyrea californica
Lepidium flavum
Lepidium fremontii
Physaria tenella
Stanleya elata
Stanleya pinnata
Thelypodium integrifolium

C
Cactaceae (cactus family)
Coryphantha chlorantha
Cylindropuntia acanthocarpa
Cylindropuntia echinocarpa
Echinocactus polycephalus
Echinocereus engelmannii
Echinocereus mojavensis
Ferocactus cylindraceus
Grusonia parishii
Mammillaria tetrancistra
Opunita basilaris
Opuntia chlorotica
Opuntia polyacantha
Sclerocactus polyancistrus

Caryophyllaceae
Achyronychia cooperi

Chenopodiaceae
Allenrolfea occidentalis
Atriplex canescens
Atriplex confertifolia
Atriplex covellei
Atriplex elegans
Atriplex hymenelytra
Atriplex polycarpa
Atriplex serenana
Atriplex spinifera
Grayia spinosa
Krascheninnikovia lanata
Salsola tragus
Sarcobatus vermiculatus
Suaeda nigra

Cleomaceae
Cleomella obtusifolia
Peritoma arborea

Crassulaceae
Dudleya saxosa

Cupressaceae
Juniperus californica
Juniperus osteosperma

E
Ephedraceae
Ephedra nevadensis
Ephedra trifurca
Ephedra viridis

Euphorbiaceae
Euphorbia albomarginata
Euphorbia setiloba
Croton californicus
Euphorbia schizoloba
Stillengia linearifolia
Stillingia spinulosa
Tragia ramosa

F
Fabaceae
Acmispon rigidus
Acmispon strigosus
Astragalus coccinus
Astragalus jaegerianus
Astragalus layneae
Astragalus lentigunosus
Astragalus newberryi
Dalea mollissima
Glycorrhiza lepidota
Lupinus arizonicus
Lupinus concinnus
Lupinus excubitus
Lupinus odorata
Lupius shockleyi
Marina parryi
Pediomelum castoreum
Prosopis glandulosus
Prosopis pubescens
Psorothamnus arborescens
Senegalia greggii
Senna armata

G
Geraniaceae
Erodium
Erodium cicutarium
Erodium texanum

Z
Zygophyllaceae (caltrop family)

List by flower color

List by growth pattern

List by common names

 California barrel cactus (Ferocactus cylindraceus)
 Banana yucca (Yucca baccata)
 Beavertail prickly pear (Opuntia basilaris)
 California fan palm (Washingtonia filifera)
 Creosote bush
 Mojave suncup (Camissonia campestris)
 Newberry's milkvetch (Astragalus newberryi)
 Cooper's dyssodia (or dogweed) (Adenophyllum cooperi)
 Death Valley monkeyflower (Mimulus rupicola)
 Desert candle (Caulanthus inflatus)
 Desert five-spot
 Desert larkspur
 Desert Lily
 Desert rock pea
 Desert star
 Erigeron concinnus
 Ipomopsis arizonica
 Joshua Tree
 Jumping Cholla
 Larrea tridentata
 Linanthus demissus
 Lupinus arizonicus
 Mesquite
 Mojave prickly poppy
 Mojave sage
 Mojave yucca
 Mormon Tea
 Branched Pencil Cholla
 Phacelia calthifolia
 Phacelia crenulata
 Pinus monophylla
 Ocotillo
 Prairie clover
 Latimer's woodland gilia (Saltugilia latimeri)
 Senna covesii
 Teddy-bear Cholla
 Utah Juniper
 Western poison oak
 White woolly daisy
 Wide-bannered lupine

References

+